Glossodoris pallida is a species of a nudibranch, a marine gastropod mollusc in the family Chromodorididae.

Distribution
This species was described from the Red Sea. It occurs in the tropical Indian Ocean including the African coast and Madagascar. It is apparently replaced by Glossodoris buko in the central Indo-Pacific Ocean.

Description
Glossodoris pallida is semi-translucent-white all over with a thin yellow-margined mantle. It also has opaque white patches on its upper mantle. Both its gills and rhinophores are also white.

Ecology
This species, like many other nudibranchs, feeds on sponges. It has also been seen feeding on grey-black sponges from the genus Cacospongia.

Glossodoris pallida, like other Chromodorid nudibranchs, stores chemicals it gains from the sponges it eats within its body. These chemicals are unpalatable to fish and other creatures, making the nudibranch much less likely to be eaten.

References

External links

Chromodorididae
Gastropods described in 1828